Josip Generalić (1935–2004) was a Croatian painter. His works can be found at the Croatian Museum of Naïve Art in Zagreb.

References

1935 births
2004 deaths
20th-century Croatian painters
Croatian male painters
21st-century Croatian painters
21st-century male artists
20th-century Croatian male artists